Cracker is a British crime drama series produced by Granada Television for ITV, created and principally written by Jimmy McGovern. Set in Manchester, the series follows a criminal psychologist (or "cracker"), Dr Edward "Fitz" Fitzgerald, played by Robbie Coltrane, who works with the Greater Manchester Police (GMP) to help them solve crimes. 

The show consists of three series, originally broadcast from 1993 to 1995. A 100-minute special set in Hong Kong followed in 1996 and another two-hour story in 2006. The show won the British Academy Television Award for Best Drama Series in 1995 and 1996, and Coltrane received the British Academy Television Award for Best Actor in three consecutive years (1994 to 1996).

Overview
Fitz is Scottish of Irish origin, alcoholic, a chain smoker, obese, sedentary, addicted to gambling, manic, foul-mouthed and sarcastic, yet cerebral and brilliant. He is a genius in his speciality: criminal psychology. As Fitz confesses in "Brotherly Love": "I drink too much, I smoke too much, I gamble too much. I am too much."

Each case spanned several episodes and cliffhangers were quite often used, but it was not until the end of the second series that a cliffhanger was employed to tie off the series. Some of the plotlines in the cases took as their starting point real events such as the Hillsborough disaster, whilst others were purely fictional with only tangential ties to actual events.

Several different psychotic types were explored during the run of the show with increasingly complex psychological motivations that, as the series entered the middle of the second series, began to expand beyond the criminals being investigated to the regular cast members. As the series moved forward, the storylines became as much about the interactions of the regulars as they were about the crimes. In many later episodes, in fact, the crimes often became background to intense, provocative explorations of the police officers' reactions to the crimes they investigated.

To emphasise how fine a line the police (and Fitz) walk in their close association with criminals, all three series featured several stories in which the police become victims of crime or themselves commit criminal acts such as rape, obstruction of justice and assault and battery.

Characters

Main cast
Robbie Coltrane as Dr Edward "Fitz" Fitzgerald. The character was named after the English poet and writer Edward FitzGerald, according to series creator Jimmy McGovern.  Coltrane won three consecutive BAFTA awards for the role, a streak matched only by Michael Gambon, Helen Mirren and Julie Walters.
Christopher Eccleston as DCI David Billborough
Ricky Tomlinson as DCI Charlie Wise
Geraldine Somerville as DS Jane "Panhandle" Penhaligon
Lorcan Cranitch as DS Jimmy Beck
Barbara Flynn as Judith Fitzgerald
Kieran O'Brien as Mark Fitzgerald
Tess Thomson as Katy Fitzgerald
John Evans as James Fitzgerald
Ian Mercer as DS George Giggs
Colin Tierney as DC Bobby Harriman
Robert Cavanah as DC Alan Temple
Stan Finni as Sgt Smith
Wil Johnson as PC/DC Michael Skelton
Clive Russell as Danny Fitzgerald. Russell was cast at Coltrane's recommendation.
Amelia Bullmore (Series 1.5, 1.6) and Isobel Middleton (Series 2.1, 2.3, 3.1) as Catriona Bilborough
Edward Peel as the Chief Super

Notable guest stars
Adrian Dunbar as Thomas Francis Kelly
Nicholas Woodeson as Michael Hennessy
Andrew Tiernan as Sean Kerrigan
Susan Lynch as Tina Brien
Christopher Fulford as Nigel Cassidy
Robert Carlyle as Albie Kinsella
Samantha Morton as Joanne Barnes
Jim Carter as Kenneth Trant
Maureen O'Brien as Virginia Trant
James Fleet as Michael Trant
Cherith Mellor as Norma Trant
Graham Aggrey as Floyd Malcolm
Mark Lambert as David Harvey
Brid Brennan as Maggie Harvey
John Simm as Bill Nash/Preece
Liam Cunningham as Stuart Grady
Paul Barber as Ian McVerry
Emily Joyce as Janice
Barnaby Kay as Dennis Philby
Anthony Flanagan as Kenny Archer

Episodes

Production
The first two series were written by Jimmy McGovern, excepting the fifth serial, "The Big Crunch", which was contributed by Ted Whitehead. Claiming that he had "nothing more to write about”, McGovern originally planned to leave after the second series but was allowed to write the controversial rape storyline, "Men Should Weep", when he agreed to contribute a three-part story to the third series. Two of McGovern's stories, "To Say I Love You" and "Brotherly Love" (from the first and third series respectively), received Edgar Awards from the Mystery Writers of America. Each serial had a different director, with the exceptions of "To Be a Somebody" and "True Romance", both directed by Tim Fywell.

Paul Abbott, who had produced the second series, wrote the remainder of the episodes (including the feature-length special "White Ghost"). Abbott later went on to create several high-profile dramas, including Touching Evil (1997), State of Play (2003) and Shameless (2004). Another crew member, Nicola Shindler, who worked as script editor on the programme, later went on to found Red Production Company.

Of the regular cast, only Coltrane and Tomlinson featured in "White Ghost" (retitled "Lucky White Ghost" for some overseas markets), which was set in Hong Kong. Although the series was still drawing large audiences after White Ghost, Coltrane declined to return as Fitz unless McGovern returned to write the series.

Cracker returned a decade after "White Ghost" in the 2006 special episode, "Nine Eleven", written by McGovern and directed by Antonia Bird. Coltrane, Flynn and O'Brien were the only actors to return in their previous roles. The new roles of DCI Walters, DS Saleh and DS McAllister were played by Richard Coyle, Nisha Nayar and Rafe Spall respectively. The story involved Fitz returning to Manchester after several years of living in Australia with Judith and his son James (who had been born during the third series) to attend his daughter Katy's wedding. The murder of an American nightclub comedian sends the police to ask Fitz for his help.

Influences
Cracker storylines often begin by showing the crime being committed, a format popularised by Columbo. Both series feature a lead character who solves crimes while masking an intelligent, perceptive nature behind a slobbish exterior, a debt acknowledged by Cracker creator Jimmy McGovern; Fitz delivers his summing-up in "To Say I Love You" while doing a Peter Falk impression.

Cracker's conception was also partly a reaction against the police procedural approach of fellow Granada crime serial Prime Suspect, placing more emphasis on emotional and psychological truth than on correct police procedure. In an interview with the NME, McGovern dismissed Prime Suspect, noting that "Good TV writing has narrative simplicity and emotional complexity," and characterising the series as "A narratively complex story going up its own arse." Gub Neal, who produced the first series of Cracker, is quoted as saying, "That we had adopted the right approach was confirmed for me when Jacky Malton, the senior woman police officer who advised on Prime Suspect, said that although the way things happened in Cracker was sometimes highly improbable, the relationships between the police were in many ways much more credible than they had been in Prime Suspect."

Locations
The series was principally filmed in south Manchester, at locations including Didsbury (where Fitz lived at the fictitious address of "15 Charlotte Road") and the police station at Longsight. The internals for the police station were filmed in the old Daily Mirror offices in central Manchester, now The Printworks retail complex. Other Manchester locations included Victoria Railway Station, St Peter's Square, Old Trafford, the Arndale Centre, UMIST, University of Salford, the Ramada Hotel, The Star and Garter (interior and exterior for the "Best Boys" episode) and the Safeway supermarket (now Morrisons) in Chorlton-cum-Hardy.  The Hulme Crescents were also used for filming in the first two episodes of series one and the first episode of series two; during which time they were being demolished. The first episode involved several railway scenes which were filmed on the East Lancashire Railway in Bury (north Manchester) both on the trackside and inside the Carriage & Wagon Works, where working volunteers from the railway used crowbars to push the carriage springs up and down to suggest a moving train, while water was poured on the windows to suggest rain between black polythene sheets and the window to indicate darkness.

Other versions
In 1997, a short spoof episode, Prime Cracker, was produced for the BBC's biennial Red Nose Day charity telethon in aid of Comic Relief. A crossover with ITV stablemate crime drama Prime Suspect, the spoof starred Coltrane and Prime Suspect lead Helen Mirren as their characters from the respective series, sending up both shows.

In 1997, a 16-part US version of Cracker — directed by Stephen Cragg and Michael Fields — was made, starring Robert Pastorelli in Coltrane's role. The original UK story lines were transferred to Los Angeles. The series finished after the first season. It was broadcast in the UK, retitled Fitz.

Home media

References

External links

Cracker at the British Film Institute

The Unofficial Guide To Cracker

 
1993 British television series debuts
2006 British television series endings
1990s British crime drama television series
2000s British crime drama television series
Edgar Award-winning works
English-language television shows
ITV television dramas
Rape in television
Television shows produced by Granada Television
Television series by ITV Studios
Television shows set in Manchester
British crime television series